Juan Francisco Melo Miquel (born February 14, 1966) is a Chilean actor, producer and also model. His first TV performance was in the TVN program Mea Culpa in 1993. From then on he has appeared in several soap operas, movies and TV shows.

Personal life

Relationships
Francisco It is very cautious about his private life. He was married to actress Patricia Velasco and they had two children, Florencia and Vincente. After nearly a decade of marriage they divorced. Al was later linked with actress Amparo Noguera, daughter of famous actor Hector Noguera with whom  maintained a low profile relationship.

Since 2004 has a stable relationship with actress Daniela Lhorente of who says she is married and very stable.

Filmography

Awards

Altazor

Fotech

Festival de San Diego

APES

Copihue de Oro

External links
 

1966 births
Living people
Chilean male film actors
Chilean male telenovela actors
Chilean male television actors
Male actors from Santiago